Mastigias ocellatus, the golden medusa, is a species of jellyfish in the family Mastigiidae. It is native to the southern Pacific Ocean.

Description
The surface of the bell is sculptured with small, polygonal nematocyst warts. There are 96 marginal lappets and eight 3-winged mouth arms, terminating in a bare, club-shaped extremity, the tip of which is blue. The bell is reddish-brown, with white spots near the edge, each with a brown centre and margin.

Distribution
M. ocellatus occurs in October in the southern Pacific Ocean. It is a pelagic species, and its method of reproduction has not been studied.

References 

Animals described in 1791
Mastigiidae